The square yard (Northern India: gaj, Pakistan: gaz) is an imperial unit and U.S. customary unit of area. It is in widespread use in most of the English-speaking world, particularly the United States, United Kingdom, Canada, Pakistan and India. It is defined as the area of a square with sides of one yard (three feet, thirty-six inches, 0.9144 metres) in length.

Symbols
There is no universally agreed symbol but the following are used:
square yards, square yard, square yds, square yd 
sq yards, sq yard, sq yds, sq yd, sq.yd.
yards/-2, yard/-2, yds/-2, yd/-2
yards^2, yard^2, yds^2, yd^2
yards², yard², yds², yd²

Conversions
One square yard is equivalent to:
 1,296 square inches
 9 square feet
 ≈0.00020661157 acres
 ≈0.000000322830579 square miles
 836 127.36 square millimetres
 8 361.2736 square centimetres
 0.83612736 square metres
 0.000083612736 hectares
 0.00000083612736 square kilometres
 1.00969 gaj

See also

 1 E-1 m² for a comparison with other areas
 Area (geometry)
 Conversion of units
 Cubic yard
 Metrication in Canada
 Orders of magnitude (area)
 Square (algebra), Square root

References

Units of area
Imperial units
Customary units of measurement in the United States